John Paul Guido Boucher Scherrer, better known by his screen name John Regala, is a Filipino actor, Christian minister and environmentalist.

Regala is popularly known for portraying antagonist roles in Philippine movies and television series especially in the 1990s. He is sometimes unofficially tagged as a "Bad Boy" of Philippine action films along with fellow action stars like Robin Padilla and the late Ace Vergel with the two being more known for the said nickname.

Career

Mainstream success and hiatus
Regala enters showbusiness and became a teen member of That's Entertainment, a hit Philippine TV show in the mid 80s.

He became an action star in his first action movie Boy Kristiano (1989). Then he portrayed a villain role to Ronnie Ricketts in an action packed movie Isa-Isahin ko Kayo (1990). He has also collaborated with the upcoming action star Jeric Raval when he played the lead role as Marcial "Baby" Ama (Regala's late uncle) Rudy Fernandez portrays his former role as Baby Ama in his true to life action-drama movie of 1976, Bitayin si Baby Ama. Raval played his role as Primitivo "Ebok" Ala in the true to life action-drama movie Primitivo Ebok Ala: Kalaban Mortal ni Baby Ama (1992) and he played his role as Kris Aquino's rapist-killer in the true-to-life crime drama movie The Vizconde Massacre: God Help Us (1993).

Return to acting

Regala returns to showbusiness. He has recently worked with Mart Escudero in the horror-comedy-thriller movie Zombading: Patayin Sa Shokot Si Remington (2011). One of his most notable and recent works is with his best friend Gov. ER Ejercito for the award-winning 2011 Metro Manila Film Festival Filipino action movie Manila Kingpin: The Asiong Salonga Story (2011) while Regala himself won the best supporting actor award. He has also worked with JC de Vera and Oyo Sotto for the TV drama series Valiente of TV5 (2012). He was once again made famous on ABS-CBN when he worked with Kim Chiu and Maja Salvador in Ina, Kapatid, Anak (2013), and with Coco Martin in an action-fantasy drama TV series Juan dela Cruz (2013) and FPJ's Ang Probinsyano (2016).

Personal life
Regala is the son of the late former character actor Mel Francisco and the late former actress Ruby Regala. His showbiz career stalled due to heavy drug abuse. Later, he went to drug rehabilitation center and became a Born Again Christian and eventually became a Christian minister. After some years of his life, he decided to become a member of the Iglesia ni Cristo. He later converted to Members Church of God International but went back to Iglesia ni Cristo in 2015. Regala is now an environmentalist and work as a President and CEO of Project Green Evolution, Inc., which produces the Water Bonsai Organic Root Grower.

In August 2020, Regala was hospitalized for liver cirrhosis.

Awards

Filmography

Television

Film

References

External links

Filipino Christian religious leaders
Filipino Christians
Filipino environmentalists
Filipino male comedians
Filipino Methodists
Filipino people of French descent
Filipino people of German descent
Filipino people of Italian descent
Filipino people of Spanish descent
Male actors from Manila
That's Entertainment (Philippine TV series)
GMA Network personalities
ABS-CBN personalities
TV5 (Philippine TV network) personalities